Hodson is a hamlet in a small valley, in the parish of Chiseldon, Wiltshire, England.

By the 13th century, Hodson was part of Chiseldon manor.

North of the hamlet is Burderop Wood, c., designated a Biological Site of Special Scientific Interest in 1971 due to the wet ash-maple and acid pedunculate oak-hazel-ash woodland.

Part of the Swindon, Marlborough and Andover Railway ran close to the north part of the hamlet (grid squares E2–F2 in the image). The line was no longer used after March 1964, and part of its route through Burderop Wood was used for the M4 motorway west of junction 15 in the 1970s.

Hodson has a public house, the Calley Arms.

See also
Hodson Stone Circle

References

Villages in Wiltshire